Gunasekaran Jeevananthan (born 13 March 1980) is a Malaysian football player who plays as a goalkeeper.

Career
Kluang-born Jeevanathan donned Johor FC colours for five years from 2000 until he left for Public Bank. A year later he moved to Sabah for a two-year stint. He returned to Johor FC in 2008 and helped the team to their best-ever finish in the Super League - third place, behind champions Kedah and runners-up Negeri Sembilan. Johor FC also reached their first ever Malaysia Cup semifinals that year.

He played for USM FC in the 2011 Malaysia Premier League season, and then loaned out to Selangor FA for the 2011 Malaysia Cup campaign. He completed his permanent transfer to Selangor for the 2012 season.

International career
He was called up for national training twice in 2002 and 2004. His first national call-up was for Malaysia's friendly match against Brazil. He was the third choice goalkeeper on the bench after Azmin Azram Abdul Aziz and Mohd Syamsuri Mustafa.

In October 2011, he was called for national training for friendly matches against India. He made his debut for the national team, at the age of 31, in the second friendly game against India, where Malaysia lost 2-3.

References

 Jeeva begins long trek to become number one - The Star, 9 February 2005
 Jeeva’s a safe pair of hands for Johor FC - Malay Mail, 29 September 2009

External links
 

Malaysian footballers
Malaysia international footballers
Malaysia Super League players
Johor Darul Ta'zim F.C. players
Sabah F.C. (Malaysia) players
Selangor FA players
ATM FA players
Penang F.C. players
PKNS F.C. players
Living people
1980 births
People from Kluang
People from Johor
Association football goalkeepers
Malaysian people of Tamil descent
Malaysian sportspeople of Indian descent